The historical and hydrological memorial "Three Wells" of local importance was  created in the Subotiv village near Chyhyryn city, Ukraine.

According to a local legend, these three wells were sunk by order of Bohdan Khmelnytsky to honor joint struggle of Ukrainian, Russian and Belarusian people for independence during the war against Polish gentry. Local storytellers say that if someone thinks of three secret wishes and drinks some water from the three wells, the wishes will come true.

References

External links 

 NHCP "Chyhyryn" site  (Ukrainian)
 Subotiv Historical Museum NHCP "Chyhyryn"  Facebook page
 Three Wells, Subotiv - IGotoWorld.com
 Category:Three Wells (Subotiv) - Wikimedia Commons
 NHCP "Chyhyryn" guide

Open-air museums in Ukraine
National Historical and Cultural Preserve "Chyhyryn"